Professor Patrick Forterre, born 21 August 1949 in Paris, is a French writer and researcher in biology. He is Head of the Department of Microbiology at the Pasteur Institute and is known for his work on Archaea, viruses and the evolution of life.  Forterre was the first to use the abbreviation of "Last Universal Common Ancestor", or "LUCA", in a 1999 paper.

Biography
In 1988, he became head of a research team at the Institute of Genetics and Microbiology (IGM) in Orsay and directed research on Archaea, the new living area discovered in 1977 by Carl Woese.  In 2004, he joined the Pasteur Institute as Director of Microbiology .

Patrick Forterre is particularly known for his theories on evolution and his stances on the recognition of viruses as living beings in their own right.

He works as a scientist in the documentary film Species of Species, produced in 2008.

Scientific articles
 Patrick Forterre, Simonetta Gribaldo & Céline Brochier : (Luca: in search of the nearest universal common ancestor) (Luca : à la recherche du plus proche ancêtre commun universel), Médecine / Sciences, vol. 21, n°10, 2005, pp. 860–865
 Simonetta Gribaldo, Patrick Forterre et Céline Brochier-Armanet : The Archaea: evolution and diversity of the third domain of life (Les Archaea : évolution et diversité du troisième domaine du vivant, Bull. Soc. Fr. Microbiol., vol. 23, n°3, 2008, pp. 137–145
 Patrick Forterre, Viruses back on the scene (Les virus à nouveau sur le devant de la scène), Biologie Aujourd’hui, vol.207, n°3, Société de biologie, 13 décembre 2013, pp. 153–168 
 Patrick Forterre, The Viral Cell Cog of Life, (La cellule virale rouage de la vie), Pour la Science, n°469, special issue: Le nouveau monde des microbes, Novembre 2016, pp. 42–49  |text=résumé

References

20th-century biologists
20th-century French non-fiction writers
21st-century biologists
21st-century French non-fiction writers
Scientists from Paris
1949 births
French virologists
French science writers
Evolutionary biologists
Evolutionary psychology
Living people